Maxence Guy Lacroix (born 6 April 2000) is a French professional footballer who plays as a centre-back for Bundesliga club VfL Wolfsburg.

Club career
On 21 August 2017, Lacroix signed his first professional contract with FC Sochaux-Montbéliard. Lacroix made his professional debut with Sochaux in a 1–0 Ligue 2 win over FC Lorient on 22 December 2018.

On 25 August 2020, Lacroix joined VfL Wolfsburg on a four-year deal. On 27 February 2021, he scored his first Bundesliga goal in a 2–0 win over Hertha BSC.

International career
Lacroix is a youth international for France, and represented the France U17s at the 2017 UEFA European Under-17 Championship and 2017 FIFA U-17 World Cup.

Personal life
Lacroix was born in Villeneuve-Saint-Georges, and his father is a nurse and his mother a doctor. He is of Guadeloupean descent through his father.

References

External links

Profile at the VfL Wolfsburg website

2000 births
Living people
Sportspeople from Villeneuve-Saint-Georges
French footballers
France youth international footballers
Association football defenders
FC Sochaux-Montbéliard players
VfL Wolfsburg players
Ligue 2 players
Championnat National 3 players
Bundesliga players
French expatriate footballers
Expatriate footballers in Germany
French expatriate sportspeople in Germany
French people of Guadeloupean descent
Footballers from Val-de-Marne